Ouadda is a town located in the Central African Republic prefecture of Haute-Kotto.

History 
Around November 2006, UFDR captured Ouadda. On 1 December 2006, FACA recaptured the town after facing a fierce battle with UFDR.

On 10 December 2012, the rebels from Séléka seized Ouadda, as well as weapons left by fleeing soldiers. In 2021 Ouadda was under the control of ex-Séléka Rassemblement patriotique pour le renouveau de la Centrafrique (RPRC). On 12 February 2022 Russian mercenaries from Wagner Group attacked Ouadda killing RPRC leader Damane Zakaria together with 20 of his men. On 11 May FPRC and UPC rebels took control of Ouadda. Five soldiers were killed, six injured and four captured by rebels.

References 

Sub-prefectures of the Central African Republic
Populated places in Haute-Kotto